Airport Express may refer to:

Technology 
AirPort Express, a wireless product by Apple Inc.

Transport

Rail 
Several airport rail links are named Airport Express:
Capital Airport Express of Beijing Subway, the airport transit service to Beijing Capital International Airport in Beijing, China
Daxing Airport Express of Beijing Subway, the airport transit service to Beijing Daxing International Airport in Beijing, China
Delhi Airport Metro Express, a Delhi Metro line linking Indira Gandhi International Airport
Airport Express (MTR), the airport railway service in Hong Kong provided by MTR, the first of its type and the first to be named so
AREX (Airport Express), the airport railway service between Incheon Airport, Gimpo Airport and Seoul, South Korea
KLIA Ekspres, the airport railway express service between Kuala Lumpur and Kuala Lumpur International Airport in Malaysia
Aeroexpress (Moscow, Sochi, Vladivostok), operator of airport rail link services in Russia

Bus 
Several airport bus connections are named Airport Express:
 Airport Express (Sydney)
Toronto Airport Express, a former coach bus service between Downtown Toronto and Toronto Pearson International Airport
Wisconsin Coach Lines, AS Airport Express operates frequently to O'Hare Airport (ORD), Midway Airport (MDW) and Mitchell Airport (MKE) from Waukesha, Milwaukee, Racine, and Kenosha

See also 
 Airport Express Train (disambiguation)
 Airport Line (disambiguation)